Domingos Emanuel da Silva Bonifácio a.k.a. Beny (born 28 October 1984) is an Angolan basketball player. At 189 cm and 76 kg (168 pounds), he plays as a point guard.

He also represented the Angolan senior team at the FIBA Africa Championship 2009. He averaged 4.7 points and 1.4 assists off the bench for the Angolans, who won their seventh consecutive FIBA Africa Championship and qualified for the 2010 FIBA World Championship.  Previously, he represented the Angolan junior side at the 2003 World Junior Championships and the 2004 FIBA Africa U-20 Championship.

He is currently playing for Petro Atlético at the Angolan major basketball league BAI Basket.

References

1984 births
Living people
Angolan men's basketball players
Olympic basketball players of Angola
Point guards
Atlético Petróleos de Luanda basketball players
C.D. Primeiro de Agosto men's basketball players
C.R.D. Libolo basketball players
G.D. Interclube men's basketball players
African Games gold medalists for Angola
African Games medalists in basketball
2010 FIBA World Championship players
Competitors at the 2007 All-Africa Games